Qarchak (also known as Qar chak) is a city in the Central District of Qarchak County, Tehran province, Iran, and serves as capital of the county. At the 2006 census, its population was 173,832 in 42,508 households, when it was in the former Qarchak District of Varamin County. The following census in 2011 counted 191,588 people in 52,769 households. The latest census in 2016 showed a population of 231,075 people in 69,029 households, by which time the district had been separated from the county, Qarchak County established, and the city of Qarchak became its capital.

References 

Qarchak County

Cities in Tehran Province

Populated places in Tehran Province

Populated places in Qarchak County